Rhizotrogus marginipes is a species of beetle in the Melolonthinae subfamily that can be found in France, Germany, Italy, Kosovo, Montenegro, Portugal, Serbia, Spain, Switzerland and Voivodina.

References

Beetles described in 1895
marginipes
Beetles of Europe